The Western Canada Hockey League was an ice hockey minor league with teams from western Canada that existed for one hockey season, 1932 to 1933. The next year, with the addition of two American franchises along with another Canadian one, the league was reformed as the North West Hockey League.

Teams
Calgary Tigers (won championship)
Edmonton Eskimos
Regina Capitals/Vancouver Maroons
Saskatoon Crescents

Final standings

External links
 League stats from hockeydb.com
 History of North American Hockey Leagues

Defunct ice hockey leagues in Canada
1932–33 in Canadian ice hockey by league